Peter Tichý (born 12 March 1969) is a Slovak racewalker. He competed in the men's 50 kilometres walk at the 1996 Summer Olympics and the 2000 Summer Olympics.

References

1969 births
Living people
Athletes (track and field) at the 1996 Summer Olympics
Athletes (track and field) at the 2000 Summer Olympics
Slovak male racewalkers
Olympic athletes of Slovakia
Place of birth missing (living people)